Martin Ádám (born 6 November 1994) is a Hungarian professional footballer who plays for K League 1 club Ulsan Hyundai and the Hungary national team as a forward.

Club career
In July 2022, Ádám moved abroad for the first time in his career and signed for K League 1 outfit Ulsan Hyundai.

Honours
Vasas
Hungarian Cup runner-up: 2016–17

Paks
Hungarian Cup runner-up: 2021–22

Ulsan Hyundai
 K League 1: 2022

References

External links 
 
 
 

1994 births
Living people
Footballers from Budapest
Hungarian footballers
Hungary under-21 international footballers
Hungary international footballers
Association football forwards
Vasas SC players
Kaposvári Rákóczi FC players
Paksi FC players
Ulsan Hyundai FC players
Nemzeti Bajnokság I players
K League 1 players
Hungarian expatriate footballers
Hungarian expatriate sportspeople in South Korea
Expatriate footballers in South Korea